The Freedom Pro Baseball League was an independent baseball league based in Arizona that played in 2012 and 2013. The league started with four teams, the Scottsdale Centennials, Peoria Explorers, Phoenix Prospectors, and the Prescott Federals in 2012.  The Phoenix Prospectors won the inaugural league championship in 2012 and repeated as champions in 2013.

Joe Sperle was the President and Founder of the Freedom Pro Baseball League. Sperle, the owner of Joe Sperle's Baseball School, has over 20 years of playing and coaching experience.

Former Major League Baseball players Julio Lugo and Joey Gathright were signed in 2013 to develop their skills to try to make a come back in the Major Leagues.

The league did not  play in 2014 because they were unable to work out a lease agreement with  Kino Stadium.

Former teams

References

Baseball leagues in Arizona
Independent baseball leagues in the United States
Sports leagues established in 2012
Defunct independent baseball leagues in the United States
2012 establishments in Arizona
2013 disestablishments in Arizona
Sports leagues disestablished in 2013